Birgit Feydt is a former East German slalom canoeist who competed in the 1970s. She won a silver medal in the K-1 team event at the 1977 ICF Canoe Slalom World Championships in Spittal.

References

East German female canoeists
Living people
Year of birth missing (living people)
Medalists at the ICF Canoe Slalom World Championships